Margaret Mary Morgan (May 1, 1866 – May 27, 1946) was a U.S. suffragist, printing business owner, politician, child welfare advocate and, in 1921, the first woman ever elected to the San Francisco Board of Supervisors.

Originally of Portland, Maine, she first obtained work with her sister in a children’s clothing store at Monument Square in Portland.  After moving to San Francisco in 1903 she obtained a position with the Walter N. Brunt Printing Company in its collections office where she was paid six dollars a week, later being promoted to the company's office manager.  She then started her own business, The Margaret Mary Morgan Printing Company, at 619 California Street.

In 1918 she was asked by the national board of the Young Women’s Christian Association to look into the welfare of women and children in China. She subsequently ran for, and was elected to the office of Supervisor of San Francisco County in 1921, serving until 1925. She was additionally involved with: the California Federation of Business & Professional Women’s Clubs; the San Francisco Business & Professional Women’s Club as its president; the California League of Women Voters as its treasurer; and also the San Francisco Nursery for Homeless Children as one of its trustees.

Upon leaving her Supervisor's office, she was quoted as saying, "Remember, a woman has to work harder than a man and have more patience in order to achieve success." She died in San Francisco, California.

References 

1866 births
1946 deaths
American feminists
San Francisco Board of Supervisors members
Women city councillors in California
Activists from California
Activists from Portland, Maine
YWCA leaders